This is a summary of notable incidents that have taken place at Walt Disney World in Orlando, Florida. The term "incidents" refers to major injuries, deaths, loss (or injury), or significant crimes related to the attractions themselves, or personal altercations and incidents between the theme park guests and employees. Attraction-related incidents usually fall into one of the following categories:
 Negligence on the park’s part, either by ride operator or maintenance.
 Negligence on the guest’s part—this includes refusal to follow specific ride safety instructions, or deliberate intent to break park rules.
 The result of a guest's known or unknown health issues.
 Acts of God, which include generic accidents (e.g. slipping and falling) that are not the direct result of an action on anyone's part.

According to a 1985 Time magazine article, nearly 100 lawsuits are annually filed against Disney for various incidents. Florida theme parks are required to notify the state of any ride-related injuries or illnesses that require a hospital stay of at least 24 hours.

Disney Transport

Ferry boat
 On April 22, 2010, a 61-year-old woman from Celebration, Florida suffered a broken lung, fractured ribs, and back pain due to a boating accident near the Magic Kingdom. The rented Sea Raycer that her husband was driving collided with a Disney ferryboat. The Orange County Sheriff's report later stated that the Sea Raycer crossed in the ferry's right-of-way.

Bus
 On March 23, 2010, a Disney transportation bus rear-ended a private charter bus near the entrance to the Epcot parking lot. Seven guests aboard the Disney bus received minor injuries, while the bus driver was reported to have received critical injuries.
 On April 1, 2010, a nine-year-old boy was crushed to death by a Disney transportation bus at Disney's Fort Wilderness Resort & Campground while riding his bicycle with an 11-year-old girl. A report from the Florida Highway Patrol says that the victim appeared to turn his bike into the road and ran into the side of the bus, subsequently being dragged under the bus's right rear tire. The victim was pronounced dead at the scene. A preliminary report stated that the bus driver, who has 30 years' experience with Disney, was not impaired or driving recklessly and that charges probably would not be filed, pending a full investigation of the incident. In October 2010, Disney World was sued for $15,106 by the boy's mother. Disney settled out of court in 2012 with her.

 On December 26, 2010, a 69-year-old man died after stepping in front of a moving Disney transportation bus in the parking lot of Disney's Port Orleans Resort.
 On August 6, 2017, a 47-year-old bus driver suffered serious injuries and was taken to Orlando Regional Medical Center after a collision occurred at an intersection. A 34-year-old man was driving in a Cadillac SUV when he ran a red light and struck the front side of the bus as he was turning. The passengers and driver onboard the vehicles were taken to Dr. P. Phillips Hospital suffering minor injuries.
 On December 11, 2018, two buses collided near the Epcot park entrance and 15 people were taken to local hospitals suffering from minor injuries.
 On August 5, 2022, a Disney transportation bus reportedly collided with a car near Magic Kingdom. As a result of the incident, the windscreen of the bus was partially removed. No reports have been made public of injuries.

Car
In April 1995, a 9-year-old boy was killed after being fatally struck by a moving car in the parking lot. A few months after the incident, his parents filed a lawsuit in July of that year seeking an unspecified amount of damage.

Disney Skyliner
 

 On October 5, 2019, a gondola became jammed while exiting the Riviera Resort station. A subsequent backlog of gondolas got stuck behind the jammed gondola inside the station, causing the entire system to stop. There were no known injuries, however, the system did not resume operations for the rest of the night, leaving passengers stranded. Reedy Creek Fire Department conducted evacuations throughout the entire line in order to safely remove passengers from the gondolas.

Monorail

 On February 12, 1974, the Mark IV Monorail Blue rear ended the Mark IV Monorail Red due to driver error. One driver and two passengers were injured.
 On June 26, 1985, a fire engulfed the rear car of the six-car Mark IV Silver monorail train in transit from the Epcot station to the Transportation and Ticket Center. This fire pre-dated onboard fire detection systems, emergency exits, and evacuation planning. Passengers in the car kicked out side windows and climbed around the side of the train to reach the roof, where they were subsequently rescued by the Reedy Creek Fire Department.<ref
name="OS27Jun1985"></ref>  Seven passengers were hospitalized for smoke inhalation or other minor injuries.  The fire department later determined that the fire started when a flat tire dragged across the concrete beam and was ignited by the frictional heat.
 On August 30, 1991, Monorail Red collided with a diesel maintenance work tractor near the Contemporary Resort as the tractor drove closely in front of the train to film it for a commercial. Two employees were treated at a hospital for injuries.
 On August 12, 1996, an electrical fire occurred on a train pulling into the Magic Kingdom station. The driver and the five passengers on board exited safely. Two bus drivers who witnessed the fire and assisted were overcome by smoke and treated at a nearby hospital.
 On July 5, 2009, during a failed track switchover from the Epcot line onto the Magic Kingdom express line, Monorail Pink backed into Monorail Purple at the Transportation & Ticket Center station, killing Monorail Purple’s pilot, 21-year-old Austin Wuennenberg. One employee and six guests who were also on the trains were treated at the scene and released. OSHA and park officials inspected the monorail line and the monorail reopened on July 6, 2009, after new sensors and operating procedures were put in place. An investigation by the National Transportation Safety Board (NTSB) showed no mechanical problems with the trains or track, but did find that the track used in the switchover was not in its proper place for the track transition. The NTSB also noted that Purple's pilot attempted to reverse his train when he saw that there was going to be a collision. Disney placed three monorail employees on paid administrative leave as a result of the incident. On October 31, 2011, the NTSB issued its findings on this incident, citing the probable cause as the shop panel operator's failure to properly align the switch beam before the monorail train was directed to reverse through it. As a result of this incident, cab riding for guests was discontinued. OSHA proposed a total of $44,000 fines against Disney for safety violations, but that amount was later reduced to $35,200.</p>
 On July 13, 2014, due to a power failure possibly caused by a lightning strike, the monorail system was temporarily disabled. Most trains were restarted and returned to stations safely. Disney cast members were unable to restart Monorail Gold, which had been heading toward Epcot when it broke down. Reedy Creek emergency personnel successfully evacuated 120 people from that train. Fire officials confirmed that the malfunction was weather-related.
 On October 10, 2015, a mechanical failure stranded guests aboard Monorail Yellow traveling between the Magic Kingdom and Disney's Contemporary Resort. Firefighters were able to rescue all the passengers about two hours after their arrival. No injuries were reported, although a number of the riders reported on social media that they had been stranded for hours.
 On November 18, 2015, Monorail Coral was being towed by a monorail tug for an unknown reason. The monorail separated from the tug, then crashed into it, causing damage to the body of the monorail and shattering the windshield. All monorail lines were shut down after the accident but resumed operations the next day.

Disney's Animal Kingdom

Avatar Flight of Passage 

 Several instances of visitors losing consciousness on the ride have been reported, leading to the installation of warning cards for riders before entering the ride. The cards are similar to those on Mission: Space and warn riders about fear of heights, motion sickness, and the seating restraints.
 On July 8, 2022, an 83-year-old man was 'briefly unresponsive' after riding the attraction.

Dinosaur

 On April 30, 2005, a 30-year-old man from Mooresville, Indiana, lost consciousness shortly after exiting the ride and died from a heart attack moments later. An investigation showed the ride was operating correctly and was not the cause of the man’s death; he had an artificial pacemaker.

Expedition Everest: Legend of the Forbidden Mountain

 On December 18, 2007, a 44-year-old man from Navarre, Florida, lost consciousness while riding the coaster. He was given CPR on the ride's loading platform and was later pronounced dead at the hospital. The Orange County medical examiner's office conducted an autopsy and concluded that the victim died of dilated cardiomyopathy and the death was considered natural.

Festival of the Lion King 

 On March 21, 2016, a small electrical fire originating from beneath one of the puppet floats broke out during a performance of Festival of the Lion King. The fire was quickly extinguished and no one was hurt in the incident. The show resumed performances the next day.

Kali River Rapids

 On May 29, 2007, five guests and one cast member were injured when an emergency exit platform malfunctioned. The guests were exiting a Kali River Rapids raft during a ride stoppage triggered by a monitoring sensor. The raft was on a steep incline and the emergency exit platform was designed to allow guests to easily access the emergency stairs from the incline. After an investigation determined that the platform "disengaged and slid", it was removed and an alternative evacuation procedure was adopted. The six people were taken to local hospitals for minor injuries and were later released.

Kilimanjaro Safaris

On February 11, 2008, a small fire broke out at the front of a ride vehicle. A woman was taken to the hospital after jumping from the truck and three other people suffered minor injuries.

Primeval Whirl

 On November 27, 2007, a 63-year-old cast member died from a brain injury sustained four days earlier when she was hit by a ride vehicle after falling from a restricted area of the ride platform. On May 23, 2008, OSHA fined Walt Disney World $25,500 and charged the company with five safety violations. The fines were: $15,000 for three serious violations; $7,500 for still missing a handrail that had been reported; and $3,000 for not responding to OSHA requests within the requested time period.</p>
 On March 13, 2011, a 52-year-old cast member sustained head injuries while working on the ride and was airlifted to Orlando Regional Medical Center, where he later died. The ride was undergoing maintenance and was closed to the public at the time of the incident.

Disney's Blizzard Beach

Downhill Double Dipper
On March 15, 2007, a man with a pre-existing medical condition collapsed on the stairs as he was waiting in line, then went into cardiac arrest after riding. He was then taken to Florida Hospital Celebration Health and died from suffering a heart attack.

Melt-Away Bay
On June 10, 2018, a 71-year-old man with a pre-existing medical condition was found unresponsive in the wave pool. He was taken to a nearby hospital and died due to suffering a heart attack shortly after arrival.

Disney's Hollywood Studios

Alien Swirling Saucers 

 On September 6, 2022, a 59-year-old woman sustained 'injuries to the toes' after riding the attraction.

Fantasmic!

 On August 7, 2016, a cast member playing Dopey from Snow White and the Seven Dwarfs fell under the railing on the top level of a steamboat down onto the level below during the show's finale. During the fall, he landed on another cast member playing Goofy. Both cast members were observed at the scene by paramedics and released.

Indiana Jones Epic Stunt Spectacular!

 In 1990, OSHA fined the resort $1,000 after three performers were injured in three separate incidents.
 In one incident, a performer fell 30 feet (9.14 m) when a restraining cable failed.
 In another incident, a performer fell 25 feet (7.62 m) when a prop ladder unexpectedly collapsed.
 A third performer was pinned by a malfunctioning trap door. OSHA cited Disney for failing to provide adequate fall protection, including padding and other equipment.
 Later, while rehearsing a new, safer routine, another performer fell 25 feet (7.62 m) onto concrete.

 In a rehearsal on August 17, 2009, a 30-year-old performer named Anislav Varbanov died after injuring his head while performing a tumbling roll. The next day’s performances  were canceled out of respect for him.

Rock 'n' Roller Coaster

 On June 29, 2006, a 12-year-old boy visiting from Fort Campbell, Kentucky, was found to be unresponsive after the ride ended. Though his father administered CPR until paramedics arrived, he was declared dead on the way to Celebration Hospital. The ride was shut down for the investigation and reopened a day later after inspectors determined that the ride was operating normally. A medical examiner determined that the boy had an undiagnosed congenital heart defect.
On December 2, 2021, the coaster was evacuated due to reports of smoke coming from the ride building. Disney confirmed to one of the Orlando television stations that there was no fire and no injuries reported.

Star Tours: The Adventures Continue

On October 24, 2016, a 67-year-old man from Memphis, Tennessee, died after riding Star Tours. The rider had a pre-existing heart condition, along with other contributing factors. The incident was described as part of a quarterly report filed with the Florida Department of Agriculture, which oversees the safety of the state's amusement parks.
On August 19, 2019, a 40-year-old man with a pre-existing medical condition had a seizure and fell after riding.

Toy Story Mania!

 In October 2014, a 64-year-old woman lost consciousness on the ride and died. The death wasn't believed to be related to the ride.

The Twilight Zone Tower of Terror

 On July 12, 2005, a 16-year-old woman from Kibworth, Leicestershire, United Kingdom complained of a severe headache and other symptoms after riding the Tower of Terror. She was taken to Celebration Hospital in nearby Orlando in critical condition, where she underwent surgery for intracranial bleeding. On August 6, 2005, she returned to the United Kingdom via air ambulance. While she had reportedly ridden the attraction several times during her visit with no ill effects, she had been in pain for a few days prior to the incident. She had a massive stroke leading to cardiac arrest. After an examination by both Disney and state inspectors showed no ride malfunction, the ride was reopened the next day. She returned home safely after spending six months in the hospital due to two heart attacks and surgery. On February 13, 2009, the victim's family sued Disney for negligence in the ride’s design, failing to adequately warn riders, and not providing proper safety restraints. They were seeking at least US$15 million. The lawsuit was voluntarily dismissed in 2012.</p>

Epcot

Body Wars

 On May 16, 1995, a 4-year-old girl from Galveston, Texas, with a known heart condition passed out during a ride on the Body Wars attraction in the Wonders of Life pavilion. The ride was immediately stopped and paramedics airlifted her to Orlando Regional Medical Center, where she was pronounced dead. An autopsy was inconclusive as to whether the ride had aggravated her condition.

Mission: Space

 From June 2005 through June 13, 2006, paramedics were called for 194 Mission Space riders. Dizziness, nausea, and vomiting were the most common complaints, according to Reedy Creek Fire Department records. Out of the 194 riders, 25 people passed out, 26 had difficulty breathing, and 16 reported irregular heartbeats or chest pain.
 On June 13, 2005, a 4-year-old boy from Sellersville, Pennsylvania, died after riding Mission: Space. An autopsy by the Orange County Medical Examiner's Office released on November 15, 2005, found that the boy died as a result of an existing, undiagnosed idiopathic heart condition called myocardial hypertrophy. A settlement between the child's parents and Disney was reached in October 2006, and the lawsuit was voluntarily dismissed on January 30, 2007.
 On April 12, 2006, a 49-year-old woman from Schmitten, Germany, fell ill after riding Mission: Space and died at Florida Hospital Celebration Health hospital in nearby Celebration, Florida. An autopsy determined that she died from a brain hemorrhage caused by longstanding and severe high blood pressure; there was no evidence of trauma attributable to the ride.
 On July 12, 2022, a 47-year-old male lost consciousness after riding the 'green version' of the attraction.

Parking lot
 On November 21, 1984, a husband and wife, along with their 1-year-old daughter, were killed and two other children were injured when the single-engine plane they were flying in crashed while attempting an emergency landing in the Epcot parking lot. The Piper aircraft was approaching an empty section of the parking lot when it clipped a light pole, shearing off the right wing, and crashing into several parked cars. The family was flying from Greer, South Carolina, to Kissimmee, Florida, for a Disney World vacation.</p>
 On January 14, 1986, the bodies of a 33-year-old man and a woman were discovered floating in a retention pond after they drove their car down an embankment and into the water during a heavy rainstorm several days earlier. Authorities speculate that the two attempted to escape from the vehicle through the driver's side window as it sank into the six-foot-deep water. The vehicle's lights and windshield wipers were found in the "on" position, leading authorities to believe that the driver lost visibility during the rainstorm, jumped a curb, and slid down an embankment into the pond.</p>

Spaceship Earth

 On August 14, 1999, a 5-year-old boy was seriously injured after exiting a ride car. He was treated for an open compound fracture at the Orlando Regional Medical Center.
On May 30, 2021, a 58-year-old man with a pre-existing heart condition passed out and later died after exiting the attraction.

Test Track

 On January 29, 2018, a 20-year-old man from Venezuela was accused and charged with lewd and lascivious behavior after he molested an 8-year-old boy on the ride. The boy and his mother were seated next to the man who put one of his arms around the boy's chest, his hand on the boy’s knee, and touched the boy’s groin during the ride. He was arrested shortly thereafter, although he claimed it was an accident.

Other incidents
 On August 1, 1987, a 27-year-old cast member was killed when the ultralight plane he was flying crashed during a show rehearsal. He was practicing for Epcot's "Skyleidoscope" show at an altitude of 500-1000 feet when the ultralight suffered catastrophic structural failure, nosediving into the ground about 150 yards from Disney's airfield and 1.5 miles from Epcot.
 On September 12, 1992, a 37-year-old man named Allen J. Ferris, from Rochester, New York, entered Epcot after the park closed its gates for the night, and brandished a shotgun at three security guards, demanding to see his ex-girlfriend who worked at the park. He fired four blasts at the guards and took two guards hostage in a restroom near the Journey Into Imagination pavilion. As Orange County sheriff's deputies surrounded the area, the man released his hostages and emerged from the restroom with the shotgun held to his chest. After exchanging words with deputies, he put the gun to his head and fired. He was pronounced dead on arrival at the Orlando Regional Medical Center. Investigators attributed his actions to a recent breakup with his long-time girlfriend.</p>
 On November 5, 2017, a runner in the Disney Wine & Dine Half Marathon collapsed and died near the finish line in the Epcot parking lot. No other details were initially disclosed.
 On August 18, 2018, a person was found dead inside of a burning car near Disney's Fantasia Gardens Miniature Golf Course at the park.
On March 12, 2019, a worker died in an industrial incident behind the France Pavilion. No details are available on the cause of death, but it is believed he fell from the roof where the upcoming attraction Remy's Ratatouille Adventure was being developed.
On November 1, 2019, a runner died while participating in Disney's Wine & Dine Weekend 5km race. The victim collapsed while running on the course.
 On March 20, 2021, a 66-year-old male guest experienced medical issues near Spaceship Earth and was later pronounced dead at AdventHealth Celebration Hospital. According to the Medical Examiner's office, he died of natural causes stemming from heart problems.
 On October 21, 2022, one of the firework launch platforms at EPCOT caught fire on Friday night after the park's nighttime show "Harmonious." The fire was contained to the fireworks platform and was extinguished, according to Disney. None of the show's other barges or platforms were impacted and no injuries were reported.

ESPN Wide World of Sports Complex

 On April 17, 2022, a young boy had two of his fingers amputated after injuring his hand on a metal sign near the baseball field. His parents filed a lawsuit and are currently seeking more than $30,000 in damages and medical bill coverage in response for his injuries sustained after the incident.

Magic Kingdom

Backstage
 On February 11, 2004, a 38-year-old cast member dressed as Pluto, who had worked at the park for eight years, died at the Magic Kingdom when he was run over by the Beauty and the Beast float in the Share a Dream Come True Parade. Disney representatives commented that "very few... if any" guests had seen the incident. This led OSHA to fine Disney US$6,300 for having employees in restricted areas.

Big Thunder Mountain Railroad

In February 2017, a 54-year-old man died after riding the attraction. His cause of death was believed to be natural causes, as he had a pre-existing medical condition. Sheri Blanton from the Orange County Medical Examiner's Office stated in an email that "the death did not appear to be one of [the examiner's] cases, so the man likely had an attending physician who agreed to sign out the death certificate due to natural causes." She further said, "If he had been under a doctor's care and there was no trauma indicated, the medical examiner's office would not be notified." A Disney spokesperson said the ride was operating as normal.

Buzz Lightyear’s Space Ranger Spin

 On March 18, 2019, a 75-year-old man fell and fractured one of his legs while getting inside one of the ride vehicles.

It's a Small World

 On August 18, 1994, a 6-year-old girl from Miami, Florida, fell out of one of the ride's boats while it was in the loading area. Orange County authorities believe an incoming boat then struck her after the fall. The girl suffered a broken hip, a broken arm, and a collapsed lung. Paramedics took her to a hospital and she was able to recover fully from her injuries. The ride was closed for an inspection and reopened the following day.</p>
 On December 25, 2014, a 22-year-old woman lost consciousness after riding the attraction and later died. The woman had a pre-existing condition.

Main Street, U.S.A.

 On August 11, 1977, a 4-year-old boy from Dolton, Illinois, drowned in the moat surrounding Cinderella Castle. His parents sued for negligence and were awarded compensation of $1.5 million.

Jungle Cruise

 On February 27, 2020, one of the Jungle Cruise boats started to sink with passengers on board, causing the ride to be shut down for nearly two hours. Videos and images that began to spread on Twitter showed passengers standing inside the boat and climbing on the railings as the water slowly rose around their legs. The Reedy Creek Fire Department responded to the incident, with all passengers safely evacuated from the ride. No injuries were reported, and the ride reopened shortly after.
On March 11, 2020, a 74-year-old woman fell and fractured her leg while trying to get into one of the boats.

PeopleMover 

 On September 25, 2022, an 83-year-old man from West Palm, Florida lost consciousness whilst riding the attraction. CPR was carried out after the ride had finished. The man was taken to Celebration Hospital but was pronounced dead at 5:04pm. Cause of death was reported as natural causes due to a pre-existing condition.

Peter Pan's Flight

On February 14, 2006, a 70-year-old man was injured as he became pinned underneath one of the ride's vehicles after falling from the conveyor belt. He was taken to Orlando Regional Medical Center by helicopter with life-threatening injuries. The ride temporarily shut down operation that same evening.

Pirates of the Caribbean

 In February 2005, a 77-year-old Minnesota woman lost consciousness and died after riding the Pirates of the Caribbean. A medical examiner's report said the victim was in poor health and she had several ministrokes. The report concluded that her death "was not unexpected."
 On August 6, 2009, a 47-year-old employee playing the role of a pirate in the "Captain Jack's Pirate Tutorial" show, accidentally slipped on a puddle on the stage and hit his head on a wall. He was taken to Florida Hospital in Orlando, with injuries including a broken vertebrae in his neck and severe lacerations on his head that required 55 stitches. He died four days later due to complications from the fall.
 In April 2014, a 12-year-old boy lacerated four fingers while riding the Pirates of the Caribbean.
 On July 10, 2014, a man in his 40s from the United Kingdom was hospitalized after losing the tips of his ring and pinky fingers on his right hand while riding the Pirates of the Caribbean. The guest had his hand outside of the ride vehicle at the time of the incident. The ride was shut down briefly for inspection and later reopened after it was deemed safe.
 In June 2015, a woman from Clay County, Florida, accidentally slipped and fell in one of the boats that had water on the floor's surface. She suffered bodily injuries and twisted her ankle. After the incident, she sued the park for more than $15,000 for her injuries.

Prince Charming Regal Carousel

 On December 12, 2010, a 77-year-old woman with pre-existing conditions collapsed after exiting. She later died due to the incident.
 On January 30, 2019, a 69-year-old man fractured his hip while getting off the ride.

Skyway

 On May 23, 1982, a 20-year-old worker was standing near the ledge of the Fantasyland station when the Skyway started up; she grabbed onto a seat and traveled  before a staff member stopped the ride.  Some visitors climbed onto the roof of a nearby building, but couldn’t reach her. She fell  to the roof, slid off, and dropped another  to the ground; she injured her back but survived.
 On February 14, 1999, a  65-year-old part-time custodian was killed when he fell off a seat. He was cleaning the Fantasyland Skyway station platform when the ride was turned on by staff who were likely unaware that he was there. He was in the path of the ride vehicles and grabbed a passing seat in an attempt to save himself. He lost his grip, fell , and landed in a flower bed near the Dumbo ride. He was dead on arrival at Orlando Regional Medical Center.  The Skyway ride, which had been scheduled to be closed before the accident occurred, was permanently closed on November 10, 1999.  As a result of the accident, OSHA fined Walt Disney World US$4,500 for violating federal safety codes in that work area.  The incident echoed a similar incident at Disneyland Resort in 1994, when a 30-year-old man "fell" 20 feet (6 m) out of a Skyway cabin and subsequently attempted to sue Disney. In that case, however, the man later admitted that he had in fact jumped out of the ride, and the case was dismissed.</p>

Space Mountain

 On August 12, 1980, a 10-year-old girl from Caracas, Venezuela, became ill while riding Space Mountain. She later died of a pre-existing heart condition from a lack of oxygen.
 In 1998, a 37-year-old man was hit on the head by a falling object. His left arm was paralyzed, and he suffered from short-term memory loss (losing his job as a result). Two objects were discovered at the bottom floor of Space Mountain: a camera and a candle from Frontierland.
 On August 1, 2006, a 6-year-old boy fainted after riding Space Mountain and was taken to Celebration Hospital where he died. The victim was a terminal cancer patient visiting the Magic Kingdom as a part of the Give Kids the World program. The medical examiner's report showed that he died of natural causes due to a metastatic pulmonary blastoma tumor.
 On December 7, 2006, a 73-year-old man lost consciousness while riding Space Mountain. He was transported to a hospital and died three days later.  The medical examiner found that the man died of natural causes due to a heart condition.
 On July 7, 2015, a 55-year-old woman from Kingsport, Tennessee, died of cardiopulmonary arrest and septic shock at Florida Hospital Celebration after losing consciousness while on the ride. According to the medical examiner, her medical history showed a history of hypertension and congestive heart failure.

Seven Dwarfs Mine Train

 On November 1, 2014, falling embers from the Wishes fireworks show landed on the artificial grass exterior of the ride, causing a fire near the bridge that the coaster travels on just before entering the mine. This caused the ride and the area around it to be evacuated. There were no injuries reported and the ride reopened later that evening.

The Haunted Mansion

 On October 19, 1991, a 15-year-old girl from Sarasota, Florida, was critically injured after she fell onto the ride’s tracks. According to witnesses, she was jumping from car to car and fell onto the track, where she was dragged under a moving car for at least 50 feet (15.24 m) before the ride stopped. She was airlifted to Orlando Regional Medical Center where she underwent emergency surgery for head and facial injuries.
 In February 2007, an 89-year-old woman fell and broke her hip while exiting a ride vehicle.
 On July 31, 2018, a 24-year-old from Winter Garden, Florida, who was a former Disney World cast member, entered a restricted area of the attraction and stole various costumes, props, and other items worth over $7,000. The suspect was arrested on May 17, 2019, and charged with burglary, grand theft, and dealing in stolen property.</p>
 On April 12, 2021, a 66-year-old woman fell and broke her wrist while exiting the ride vehicle.

Splash Mountain 

 On November 5, 2000, a 37-year-old man from St. Petersburg, Florida was fatally injured while trying to exit the ride vehicle while it was moving. He told fellow passengers that he felt ill and attempted to reach one of the attraction's marked emergency exits.  He was struck by the following ride vehicle and died at Celebration Hospital.
 On August 2, 2020, one of the log flume boats began to sink underwater. In a video shown on Twitter, a cast member can be heard telling guests not to exit the vehicle because standing on a platform on the side of the ride poses a "safety hazard."
 On April 4, 2022, a similar incident occurred when one of the log flume boats began to sink again. This was the second time guests had to be evacuated following the Jungle Cruise incident in 2020.
 On July 12, 2022, one of the log flume boats began to sink for the third time. This video, shared by Ted Klein on Facebook, shows guests both still in the log and in the flume surrounding it, attempting to evacuate their fellow riders. The action took place near the attraction’s end, next to where Br’er Fox’s tail is being pulled on by Br’er Gator.
 On January 21, 2023, a guest was injured while slipping at the boarding station. Paramedics were called and the ride was temporarily shut down.

Tomorrowland Speedway

On July 23, 2019, a 75-year-old man suffered injuries after falling into one of the ride's vehicles.
On September 25, 2022, a 27-year-old woman went into labor after riding the attraction.

Under the Sea - Journey of the Little Mermaid

On July 21, 2019, a 69-year-old woman who had a pre-existing medical condition suffered a seizure after experiencing the attraction.

Cosmic Ray's Starlight Cafe
 In March 2010, a 4-year-old boy from San Diego, California, suffered severe face and neck burns after being scalded by a tray of hot nacho cheese. The accident occurred when the boy sat down to dinner in an unstable chair and grabbed a food tray to prevent himself from falling, resulting in the cheese falling off the tray and into his lap. The child’s parents sued Disney, with their attorney claiming that "the cheese should not have been that hot" and that Disney made no effort "to regulate and monitor the temperature of the nacho cheese which was being served to young children." A Disney representative commented on the incident: "It's unfortunate when any child is injured. We just received notice of the lawsuit and are currently reviewing it." The family settled out of court in 2011.</p>

Other incidents involving guests
 On May 29, 2007, a 34-year-old woman from Clermont, Florida, was attacked by a 51-year-old park guest from Anniston, Alabama, as they waited in line at the Mad Tea Party attraction. The attacker was convicted on charges of battery and sentenced to 90 days in jail; nine months of formal probation; and an anger management course. The victim and her husband later filed two separate lawsuits against Disney. Her lawsuit claimed, among other things, that Walt Disney World provided inadequate staff and security at the ride; there was a lack of adequate training to recognize security threats; that the park did not anticipate the attack and have the attacker removed before anything happened; and that the following investigation was mishandled. Her husband’s lawsuit against Disney claimed the loss of his wife's support and companionship due to the attack. In 2011, a jury found in favor of Disney.</p>
 On October 17, 2019,  a 50-year-old man from Orlando was arrested for lewd and lascivious molestation in multiple, separate incidents.

Fire breakouts
 On November 4, 1974, a carpenter died from a mini-explosion caused by glue at an unknown construction area in the Magic Kingdom. On October 28, 1976, the widow of the carpenter filed a suit against 3M and the Traveler's Indemnity Company for the death of the carpenter. 
On December 10, 2019, a small fire occurred inside Big Top Souvenirs. No one was harmed during the incident and the shop was closed for several days and meet-and-greets moved outside from Pete's Silly Sideshow.
On January 2, 2020, a small fire broke out on the Speedramp leading to the Tomorrowland Transit Authority PeopleMover in Tomorrowland. Guests were evacuated off the ride; the ride, as well as the Astro Orbiter, were closed for an hour. The Reedy Creek Fire Department responded to the incident.
On December 14, 2021, a small fire broke out in a mulched area by Cinderella Castle. Disney Employees used fire extinguishers and put the fire out before Reedy Creek Fire Department arrived on scene. Fire personnel treated a security guard who inhaled dry chemicals from a fire extinguisher. The cast member was transported from the park for non-emergency treatment and released shortly after. At the time of the incident it appeared a firework had caught the tree and mulch on fire. However the cause of the fire is still being investigated.

Disney's Typhoon Lagoon

Miss Adventure Falls

 On December 8, 2018, a 44-year-old man was seriously injured when his arm got caught in the conveyor belt. Employees' attempts to free the man were unsuccessful. After being freed by fire rescue personnel, the man was flown to a hospital by helicopter to be treated for non-life-threatening injuries. The ride was closed the following day pending further investigation.

Mayday Falls
 On May 3, 2018, a 25-year-old man fractured his ankle while going down Mayday Falls.

Wave pool
 On August 4, 2005, a 12-year-old girl from Newport News, Virginia felt ill while using the wave pool. Lifeguards talked with her after noticing her lying down on the side of the pool; she said she felt fine, but passed out shortly after standing up. Though lifeguards performed CPR on her until paramedics arrived, she was pronounced dead shortly after arriving at Celebration Hospital. The autopsy showed that she died due to arrhythmia caused by an early-stage viral heart infection.

Other incidents involving guests
 On February 7, 2003, a 31-year-old woman tripped and fractured her ankle on stairs leading to a catch pool. She died of pulmonary embolism the next month on March 2, 2003.
 On July 3, 2009, a 51-year-old man from Farmington, New York, was charged with lewd and lascivious molestation after allegedly attempting to remove swimsuits from five teenage girls while all were in the wave pool. Disney security was notified and they called for Orange County deputies.
 On July 10, 2009, a 51-year-old Connecticut man was charged with lewd and lascivious exhibition after he allegedly fondled himself in front of a teenage girl near the park's wave pool. One eyewitness, a visitor who worked with paroled sex-offenders in Missouri, confronted the man who then fled the scene. As he attempted to leave the parking lot, he ran a stop sign and was stopped by an Orange County deputy, and after discovering the man had been driving with a suspended license, he was detained. The man denied the lewd conduct charges, claiming his European-style swimsuit was too small. This was the fifth sexual-related reported incident to occur at a Central Florida water park in 2009; the other parks aside from Typhoon Lagoon were Blizzard Beach; Aquatica; and Wet 'n Wild. The charges were dropped in August 2009 after prosecutors determined there was insufficient evidence in the case.</p>
 On July 16, 2009, a 29-year-old man from Washington was arrested and charged with one count of lewd and lascivious molestation of a 13-year-old boy. He was sentenced to two years in prison.
 On July 3, 2016, a 27-year-old Indian national was arrested and charged with four counts of lewd and lascivious molestation on a child over 12 years old but under the age of 16, and two counts of battery on accusations of groping six people in the wave pool. The man was released on bond a few days later.

Characters

Costume-related issues 
In 2005, Walt Disney World reported 773 injuries to OSHA for employees portraying any of 270 different characters at the parks.

 Of those injuries listed, 282 (roughly 36%) were related to costuming issues such as a costume’s weight affecting the head, neck, or shoulders.
 49 injuries (6%) were specifically due to the costume’s head.
107 injuries (14%) were caused by park guests' interactions with the characters where the guest hit, pushed, or otherwise hurt (intentionally or not) the costumed cast member.
Other items in the report include skin rashes, bruises, sprains, or heat-related issues.

One change that Disney made to assist character performers was to change rules limiting the overall costume weight to be no more than 25% of the performer's body weight.

Guest altercations and other incidents 

 On April 1, 2004, a 36-year-old Disney cast member from St. Cloud, Florida, was arrested for allegedly fondling a 13-year-old and her mother while he was dressed as Tigger during a photo opportunity at Magic Kingdom's ToonTown on February 21, 2004. Originally charged with one count of simple battery and one count of lewd and lascivious molestation of a child between 12 and 15 years old, the case went to trial, during which the defense produced the Tigger costume to demonstrate the difficulties of maneuvering the costume's oversized gloves and the actor’s limited line of sight in the costume. After less than an hour of deliberation, the jury acquitted the employee of all charges. He pleaded not guilty to the charges he faced during his testimony on August 3, 2004, and he returned to work at Disney later that month after a suspension.
 On September 15, 2004, the same cast member was suspended once again for allegedly shoving two other employees while he was dressed as Goofy at Animal Kingdom. Initially, the two employees believed that Goofy was their friend joking around until they saw the cast member relaxing backstage while partially out of costume. During the investigation, two other Animal Kingdom employees came forward saying the cast member had touched their breasts. The lawyer claimed that the cast member was merely looking at their lanyards containing lapel trading pins.</p>
 On January 5, 2007, a 14-year-old child from Greenville, New Hampshire, was allegedly punched in the head by a 31-year-old Disney employee dressed as Tigger during a photo opportunity at Disney's Hollywood Studios.  The family felt that the act was deliberate and filed a police report of battery against the suspect.  The cast member was suspended pending the results of the investigation.  In the statement to the sheriff's office, he claimed that he was acting in self-defense as the child was pulling on the back of the costume and causing him to lose his breath.
 On February 15, 2007, the State Attorney General's office announced that no charges would be filed against the employee.</p>
 On June 7, 2009, a 60-year-old man from Cressona, Pennsylvania, allegedly groped a cast member dressed as Minnie Mouse while visiting Magic Kingdom's ToonTown. The case went to trial on August 11, 2009. The man was convicted of charges of misdemeanor battery and he was sentenced to 180 days of probation and 570 hours of community service.
 On August 12, 2010, a 27-year-old woman from Upper Darby, Pennsylvania, filed a lawsuit against Disney claiming that a cast member in costume as Donald Duck had groped her during a photo and autograph session while on a family vacation in May 2008. The lawsuit was for $200,000 in damages to compensate the alleged victim for negligence, battery, and infliction of emotional distress. The woman claimed to suffer from severe physical injury, emotional anguish, acute anxiety, headaches, nightmares, flashbacks, and other emotional and physical ailments.  Disney settled the lawsuit with the claimant for an undisclosed amount in 2011.
 On November 2, 2019, a 51-year-old sex offender was arrested and charged with battery after groping a cast member playing Ariel during a meet-and-greet.

Resort hotels

Disney's Art of Animation Resort

 On July 14, 2015, a 3-year-old child was found at the bottom of a resort pool after becoming separated from his parents. Officials with the Orange County Sheriff's Office reported the child was later pronounced dead at an area hospital.
 On June 25, 2017, a 5-year-old boy became separated from his parents while at the resort. The Reedy Creek Improvement District and the Orange County Sheriff's Office eventually found him drowning in one of the resort’s pools. The boy was airlifted to Arnold Palmer Hospital for Children where he was reported to be in critical condition, though he later recovered.

Disney's Beach Club Resort 

 In April 2022, a 37-year-old female guest was exiting the lazy river at Stormalong Bay when she suffered a 3 inch laceration on her forearm caused by the resort-provided floatation devices. She later recovered.

Disney's BoardWalk Inn 

 On June 29, 2000, a waiter and a child were held hostage by the child's father in a hotel room over domestic issues. During the hostage situation, other guests were evacuated and given alternative accommodations in the resort. The man released the hostages and handed himself over to authorities in the early hours of June 30, 2000.

Disney's Caribbean Beach Resort 

 On October 31, 1992, a 21-year-old woman filed a lawsuit seeking damages after she was allegedly attacked in her hotel room. Although no suspicious suspect was reported during the scene of the crime, it was later reported that the incident was deemed as a scam, implying that the woman allowed her brother to verbally assault her. She was eventually taken into custody and faced criminal charges.
 On December 18, 2020, a 43-year-old female travel agent fell several stories from the resort and died four days later due to suffering blunt force trauma to the head after the fall. The District Nine Medical Examiner's Office didn't file an autopsy report regarding the woman's death as it was deemed accidental since she apparently fell from a standing height all the way down until suffering a traumatic head injury afterward.

Disney's Contemporary Resort 

 On November 12, 1992, an off-duty cast member fell off the ledge outside the Top of The World restaurant on the Contemporary Resort’s 15th floor. The cast member had been sitting on the ledge when a swarm of wasps appeared. The cast member lost his balance and fell to his death 11 stories below while trying to swat them away.
 On March 22, 2016, a death occurred at Disney's Contemporary Resort. The monorail's service was temporarily suspended while the Orange County Sheriff's Office investigated. Investigators announced that they believe that the person died by suicide. According to multiple sources, the person jumped to their death inside the central A-frame tower.
 On May 28, 2018, an intoxicated man was arrested at Disney's Contemporary Resort after he falsely told other guests an active shooter was in the resort. Panic soon followed and the resort was placed on lockdown until police arrived. The reports were traced back to the man, who was found hiding in bushes outside of the resort. In questioning, the man claimed he did it to get reactions from people for a class and his YouTube channel.
 On March 4, 2020, a woman died in an apparent suicide at Disney's Contemporary Resort. Deputies from the Orange County Sheriff's Office responded to the resort around 4 p.m. after receiving a call that someone may have jumped off of the building. Upon arrival and with help from the Reedy Creek Improvement District, they found an unresponsive woman who was later pronounced dead at the scene.

Disney's Fort Wilderness

 On August 22, 1980, an 11-year-old boy from New York City died after swimming in the River Country water park next to the campground. The cause of death was amoebic meningoencephalitis, traces of which were found in the water.
 On April 16, 1982, a 36-year-old woman from Little Silver, New Jersey, collapsed and died while walking away from the Water Flume ride in River Country.
 On August 9, 1982, a 14-year-old boy from Erie, North Dakota, drowned at River Country. He was pulled from the water at the River Country Cove about five minutes after the youth slid down a  slide into  of water. He was pronounced dead at a hospital.
 On October 10, 1986, an 8-year-old boy was attacked by an alligator when he and his siblings were wandering near the lake's edge while watching ducks.
 On May 23, 1987, a 6-year-old boy drowned in a swimming pool. The family later sued, stating that the resort should have had more than one lifeguard on duty to monitor the crowded pool and that the pool should have had a safety line between the shallow and deep ends.
 On July 10, 1989, a 13-year-old boy from Longwood, Florida, drowned at River Country. He was swimming with eight classmates and two counselors. Fifteen minutes later, another swimmer felt the boy under his feet in about five feet (1.52 m) of water and dragged him out. He was pronounced dead on arrival at Sand Lake Hospital.

Disney's Grand Floridian Resort & Spa

 On October 9, 1989, a 33-year-old woman from Glen Cove, New York, was killed when a small speedboat collided with a ferry boat. She and her eight-year-old son were broadsided by the ferry while trying to videotape friends and family members who were water skiing in the Seven Seas Lagoon. A crew member and a visitor on the ferry dove into the water and rescued her son. The boy was not hurt in the accident. The family sued Disney for $240 million, claiming that the ferry's operators should have seen the speedboat before it came so close.
 On June 14, 2016, a 2-year-old boy from Elkhorn, Nebraska, was attacked by an alligator at 9:15am on the shore of the Seven Seas Lagoon. His parents unsuccessfully tried to intervene and the boy was pulled into the water. Reuters reported that the resort would put up signs around warning guests about alligators. Since the incident, Disney has added warning signs and rope-barriers to waterways around the entire resort. For a short time, references to alligators were removed from a number of attractions, including the Jungle Cruise.</p>

Disney's Polynesian Village Resort

 On April 6, 1982, a 2-year-old girl from Sunrise, Florida, died after being injured outside a park restaurant. She was standing in line with her family outside the Coral Isle Coffee Shop when she and her 12-year-old sister were playing with a rope tied to a large menu board. The girls pulled on the rope and the board fell on top of the toddler, killing her. She was pronounced dead on arrival at Orange Vista Hospital.

 On May 29, 2019, a woman in her early 30s from Celebration, Florida, sued the park after being injured in 2017. As she was walking on the dock of the Seven Seas Lagoon, a seasonal nesting bird apparently dive-bombed and struck her in the head. She then suffered a traumatic brain injury and sought unspecified damages of $15,000 following the incident. The resort was also accused of not keeping the dock safe by warning visitors of the potential hazard.

Disney's Pop Century Resort

 On March 12, 2013, a 13-year-old from Springfield, Missouri, drowned at one of the pools in the resort. He was swimming in the Hippy Dippy pool with some other guests and there were no lifeguards on duty at the time when the incident occurred.
 On July 3, 2016, a 7-year-old boy claimed that he was groped by a youth baseball coach from Wisconsin in one of the resort's pools. The coach was arrested and charged with four counts of lewd and lascivious molestation.
 On July 9, 2018, a 33-year-old cast member died in an industrial accident near the Pop Century and Caribbean Beach resorts. A Toro utility cart crushed the employee, causing him to fall unconscious. Workers who were unable to lift the cart, along with officials, pronounced  him dead at the scene.

Dolphin Hotel
 On August 14, 1989, at around 9am, a 30-year-old male construction worker was connecting a scaffolding until losing his balance as he fell seventeen stories from the twenty-third floor and landed on the roof of the sixth floor. He was pronounced dead an hour later after being taken to Orlando Regional Medical Center.

Doubletree Guest Suites
 On June 19, 2010, a dead body was discovered at the hotel. The manner of death was originally unknown, but was later declared a suicide.

JW Marriott Bonnet Creek
 On August 29, 2018, two workers on the site of a hotel that was under construction fell to their death when scaffolding around the building collapsed, a third worker sustained minor injuries and a fourth escaped unharmed.

Discovery Island (Bay Lake)
In 2009, an account was published of an unauthorized exploration "a couple of years ago" with photographs by Shane Perez. In 2017 a film was published by Matt Sonswa of exploration of the island.
On April 30, 2020, a man was arrested for camping on Discovery Island (Bay Lake). He was removed from the island and banned from Walt Disney property. He called the island a "tropical paradise", and said he did not know the area was off limits to the public.

Walt Disney World Speedway

 On April 12, 2015, a 36-year-old driving instructor was fatally injured and the driver was hospitalized with minor injuries after a crash during a run as part of the Exotic Driving Experience. The instructor was riding in the passenger seat of a Lamborghini Gallardo LP570-4 Superleggera, when the driver lost control and crashed into a metal  guardrail. The Florida Highway Patrol investigated and announced that, while the decision to run vehicles clockwise (instead of counter-clockwise as the track was designed for) may have been a factor in the incident, it was an accident and no charges were filed against the driver since it  on private property.

See also
Amusement park accidents
List of incidents at Disney parks

References

Disney-related lists
Disney's Animal Kingdom
Disney's Hollywood Studios
Epcot
Walt Disney World
Walt Disney World
Magic Kingdom
Walt Disney World
Walt Disney World